Vasco José Cardoso Sousa (born 3 April 2003) is a Portuguese professional footballer who plays as a midfielder for Porto B.

International career
Sousa has represented Portugal at youth international level.

Career statistics

Club

Notes

References

2003 births
People from Penafiel
Sportspeople from Porto District
Living people
Portuguese footballers
Portugal youth international footballers
Portugal under-21 international footballers
Association football midfielders
F.C. Paços de Ferreira players
Vitória S.C. players
FC Porto players
FC Porto B players
Liga Portugal 2 players
Primeira Liga players